Andrejs Plakans (born 1940) is a Latvian American historian. He is emeritus professor of history at Iowa State University.

Publications

Books
A Concise History of the Baltic States (Cambridge University Press, 2011)
The Latvians: A Short History (Hoover Institution Press, 1995)
Kinship in the Past: An Anthropology of European Family Life, 1500-1900 (B. Blackwell, 1984)
Historical Dictionary of Latvia (Scarecrow Press, 1997)
Experiencing Totalitarianism: The Invasion and Occupation of Latvia by the USSR and Nazi Germany 1939-1991 (AuthorHouse, 2014)
The Reluctant Exiles: Latvians in the West after World War II (Brill Schoningh, 2021)

Editor
Family History at the Crossroads: A Journal of Family History Reader

References 

Living people
1940 births
American historians
Historians of Latvia
Iowa State University faculty